Leonid Yurkovskiy (born 1995) is a Swedish politician affiliated with the Sweden Democrats.

Yurkovskiy was born in Russia before moving to Sweden and states his emigrating from Russia to the West shaped his political outlook. He served as a municipal councilor for the SD in Stockholm. He was elected as Member of the Riksdag in September 2022. He represents the constituency of Stockholm County.

References 

Living people
1995 births
Swedish people of Russian descent
21st-century Swedish politicians
Members of the Riksdag 2022–2026
Members of the Riksdag from the Sweden Democrats